Crenicichla jupiaensis is a species of cichlid native to South America. It is found swimming in the upper Paraná River basin.

References

Kullander, S.O., 2003. Cichlidae (Cichlids). p. 605-654. In R.E. Reis, S.O. Kullander and C.J. Ferraris, Jr. (eds.) Checklist of the Freshwater Fishes of South and Central America. Porto Alegre: EDIPUCRS, Brasil.

jupiaensis
Taxa named by Heraldo Antonio Britski
Taxa named by José A. Luengo
Fish described in 1968